The Foix Tunnel is a tunnel located in Foix in the French department of Ariège on the RN20. Construction began in March 1996 and the tunnel opened on 30 October 2004. It has one tube with a length of 2,159 m.

External links 
 The Foix Tunnel on Structurae

Road tunnels in France